Governor Crittenden may refer to:

John J. Crittenden (1787–1863), 17th Governor of Kentucky
Robert Crittenden (1797–1834), Acting Governor of Arkansas Territory, brother of John J. Crittenden
Thomas Theodore Crittenden (1832–1909), 24th Governor of Missouri, nephew of John J. Crittenden and Robert Crittenden.